Bunji Okada (1874–1943) was Director of the Karafuto Agency (1914–1916). He was Governor of Tochigi Prefecture (1911–1914). He was a graduate of the University of Tokyo.

1874 births
1943 deaths
University of Tokyo alumni
Directors of the Karafuto Agency
People from Yamagata Prefecture
Governors of Tochigi Prefecture